Woodny Turenne (born January 25, 1987) is a former gridiron football cornerback. He was signed by the Chicago Bears as an undrafted free agent in 2009. He played college football at Louisville.

He was also a member of the New York Giants, Hamilton Tiger-Cats and Saskatchewan Roughriders.

Professional career

Chicago Bears
He was initially released by the Bears, but was signed to their practice squad on October 13, 2009.

New York Giants
Turenne was signed to the New York Giants' practice squad on November 24, 2010.

In 2011, he injured his calf during training camp and was waived/injured and later released with an injury settlement on August 23.

Hamilton Tiger-Cats
He was signed as a free agent by the Hamilton Tiger-Cats on September 27, 2011.

Saskatchewan Roughriders
He played for the Saskatchewan Roughriders from 2012 to 2014.

References

External links
Saskatchewan Roughriders bio

1987 births
Living people
Players of American football from Fort Lauderdale, Florida
Players of Canadian football from Fort Lauderdale, Florida
American football safeties
Canadian football defensive backs
American players of Canadian football
Louisville Cardinals football players
Chicago Bears players
New York Giants players
Hamilton Tiger-Cats players
Saskatchewan Roughriders players